Russian Fairy Tales (variously translated; English titles include also Russian Folk Tales) is a collection of nearly 600 fairy and folktales, collected and published by Alexander Afanasyev between 1855 and 1863.  His literary work was explicitly modeled after Grimm's Fairy Tales.

Vladimir Propp drew heavily on this collection for his analyses in his Morphology of the Folktale.

Fairy tales
Some of the tales included in these volumes:
 The Death of Koschei the Immortal
 Vasilisa the Beautiful
 Vasilisa the Priest's Daughter
 Father Frost
 Sister Alenushka, Brother Ivanushka
 The Frog Princess
 Vasilii the Unlucky
 The White Duck
 The Princess Who Never Smiled
 Snegurochka, or The Snow Maiden
 The Wicked Sisters
 The Twelve Dancing Princesses
 The Magic Swan Geese
 The Feather of Finist the Falcon
 Tsarevitch Ivan, the Firebird and the Gray Wolf
 The Sea Tsar and Vasilisa the Wise
 The Bold Knight, the Apples of Youth, and the Water of Life
 Go I Know Not Whither and Fetch I Know Not What
 The Golden Slipper
 The Firebird and Princess Vasilisa
 The Armless Maiden
 The Gigantic Turnip
 Emelya the Simpleton
 Dawn, Midnight and Twilight
 The Fiend or The Vampire (Upyr)
 The Lute Player
 The Language of the Birds
 The Norka
 The Maiden Tsar
 Sivko-Burko
 Donotknow

References

Publications

 , 3 vols, (first edition 1859)
alt links vol. 1 , vol. 2 , vol. 3

Translations

Extracts of limited selections of stories from the books have been used several times in translation, these include :

External links
 , lists and descriptions of editions of the work 
 Русские народные сказки , e-texts of "Russian fairy tales"

Collections of fairy tales
 
1855 books